The 2021–22 Montana State Bobcats men's basketball team represented Montana State University in the 2021–22 NCAA Division I men's basketball season. The Bobcats, led by third-year head coach Danny Sprinkle, played their home games at Brick Breeden Fieldhouse in Bozeman, Montana as members of the Big Sky Conference. They finished the regular season 24–7, 16–4 in Big Sky play to win the Big Sky regular season championship. As the No. 1 seed in the Big Sky tournament, they defeated Sacramento State, Weber State, and Northern Colorado, to win the tournament, and earned the Big Sky's automatic bid to the NCAA tournament.

Given a No. 14 seed in the West Region of the NCAA Tournament, Montana State was defeated by Texas Tech in the first round.

Previous season
In a season limited due to the ongoing COVID-19 pandemic, the Bobcats finished the 2020–21 season 13–10, 8–6 in Big Sky play to finish in a tie for fourth place. They defeated Idaho State and Southern Utah before losing to Eastern Washington in the championship of the Big Sky tournament.

Roster

Schedule and results

|-
!colspan=12 style=| Exhibition

|-
!colspan=12 style=| Regular season

    

|-
!colspan=12 style=| Big Sky tournament

|-
!colspan=12 style=| NCAA tournament

Source

References

Montana State Bobcats men's basketball seasons
Montana State Bobcats
Montana State Bobcats men's basketball
Montana State Bobcats men's basketball
Montana State